, known under the professional name , is a Japanese actress, voice actress and singer. Her debut role was as a preschooler on Urusei Yatsura. She is currently employed by the talent management firm Troubadour Musique Office.

Filmography

Animation

TV 
 Fushigi na Koala Blinky (Mark)
 Anpanman (Frankenrobo)
 Chibi Maruko-chan (Momoko Sakura – Marukochan)
 Coji-Coji (Suzie)
 Combat Mecha Xabungle (Chill)
 Danganronpa 3: The End of Hope's Peak High School (Monokuma)
 Ganbare, Kickers! (Taichi Ohta)
 Hunter × Hunter (1999) (Melody)
 InuYasha and Hanyo no Yashahime (Kirara)
 Kimba the White Lion (Lulu, other voices)
 Kindaichi Case Files (Asuka Minatoya)
 Magical Tarurūto-kun (Tarurūto)
 Meitantei Kageman (Kageman)
 Mikan Enikki (Mikan)
 Mushiking: King of the Beetles (Chibi King)
 NG Knight Ramune & 40 (Hebimetako)
 Nichijou (Plus-screw at episode 16)
 Noir (Altena)
 Patlabor: The TV Series (Tamiko Shinshi)
 Pluster World (Maurie)
 Urusei Yatsura (Sugar, preschooler)
 VS Knight Ramune & 40 Fire (Hebimetako)

Original video animation (OVA) 
 Hunter × Hunter OVA (Melody)
 NG Kishi Ramune & 40 DX (Hebimetako)
 NG Kishi Ramune & 40 EX (Hebimetako)

Films 
 Castle in the Sky (Madge)
 My Neighbor Totoro (friend B)
 Nausicaä of the Valley of the Wind (boy)
 They Were 11 (Toto)
 Xabungle Graffiti (Chill)

Commercials 
 Seiko Epson Colorio (Narration)

Drama CDs 
 Eiyū Densetsu III: Shiroki Majo "Wakatareta Mizuumi" (Ban Ban)
 Kaze no Densetsu Xanadu II: Heroine-tachi no Tanjōbi (Kururu)
 Popful Mail Paradise 4–5 (Nairu)
 Tarako Pappara Paradise (Tarako-neesan, Kururu, Nairu, Ban Ban, Obāsan

Live action

Films 
 Tsurubaka Nisshi 3

Video games 
 2nd Super Robot Wars Z: Hakai-Hen (Chiru)
 Chibi Maruko-chan: Maruko Deluxe Quiz (Momoko "Maruko" Sakura)
 Chibi Maruko-chan: Mezase! Minami no Island!! (Momoko "Maruko" Sakura)
 Chibi Maruko-chan no Taisen Puzzle Dama (Momoko "Maruko" Sakura)
 Chibi Maruko-chan: Maruko Enikki World (Momoko "Maruko" Sakura)
 Chibi Maruko-chan DS Maru-chan no Machi (Momoko "Maruko" Sakura)
 Cotton: Fantastic Night Dreams (PC Engine version) (Nata de Cotton)
 Danganronpa V3: Killing Harmony (Monokuma)
 Inuyasha (Kirara)
 Magical Taluluto (Megadrive version) (Taluluto)
 Momotarō Dōchūki (Chibi Bonbī)
 One Piece: Unlimited World Red (Pato)
 Sakura Momoko Gekijō Koji Koji (Sūjī)
 Super Bomberman: Panic Bomber W
 Super Robot Wars Alpha Gaiden (Chiru)
 Super Robot Wars NEO (Hebimetako)
 Super Robot Wars OE: Operation Extend (Hebimetako)
 Super Robot Wars Z (Chiru)
 Tail Concerto (Panta)
 Zero Escape: Virtue's Last Reward (Zero III)

Radio 
 Tarako Falcom Pīhyarara

Other voice over 
Fuji TV
 The Judge! Tokusuru Hōritsu File "Korette Tsumi Janai no" segment (Narration)
 Naruhodo! The World (Reporter)
 Quiz & Game Tarō to Hanako (Host)

NHK Educational
 Okome (Narration)

TBS
 Shiawase Kazoku Keikaku (Narration)

TV Asahi
 Zenigata Kintarō (Narration)

Other
 Chibi Maruko-chan (Screenplay director)
 Noozles (Theme song performance)

Discography 
Listed chronologically.

Albums 
 Totte Oki no Shunkan (1983)
 Kaze ga Chigau (1984)
 Warawanai Koibito (1985)
 Kokuhaku (1985)
 Sukoshi Dake Ai ga Tarinai (1986)
 Anata ga Daisuki (1990)
 Kanojo (1991)
 My dear (1991)
 Tengoku yori Takai Toko Ikō yo (1993)
 Wāi. (1995)

References

External links 
 Official agency profile 
 
 Tarako at GamePlaza-Haruka Voice Acting Database 
 Tarako at Hitoshi Doi's Seiyuu Database
 

1960 births
Living people
Anime screenwriters
Japanese women singers
Japanese screenwriters
Japanese stage actresses
Japanese video game actresses
Japanese voice actresses
Musicians from Gunma Prefecture
Voice actresses from Gunma Prefecture